Harold "Hal" Goodman (May 9, 1915 - September 3, 1997) was an American producer and screenwriter. He wrote for The Tonight Show Starring Johnny Carson, with his partner Larry Klein.

Career 
Goodman started his career writing for the television film Let's Join Joanie. He first met Johnny Carson in 1953.

Goodman wrote for Flip Wilson, Jack Benny and Bob Hope. He was nominated for Primetime Emmy awards eight times, winning one in 1971 for work on The Flip Wilson Show. Goodman worked with producer and screenwriter Larry Klein writing for The Flip Wilson Show and The Carol Burnett Show.

Death 
Goodman died in September 1997 at his home in Los Angeles, California, at the age of 82.

References

External links 

1915 births
1997 deaths
American comedy writers
American screenwriters
American television writers
American television producers
American male television writers
American male screenwriters
20th-century American screenwriters